The Armenian Cemetery of Moscow (Armyanskoe Vagan'kovskoe Kladbishche) is an Armenian historical cemetery in Moscow, Russia  It is located in the Krasnaya Presnya (Красная Пресня) district, not far from Vagankovo Cemetery. The cemetery was established in 1804 by the initiative of Minas Lazarev, the leader Moscow’s Armenian community, who also initiated the construction of the Surb Harutyun Armenian church (1808–1815). The Lazarev family crypt is located under the church. The cemetery and the church are under state protection. Among the state-protected monuments are the obelisk on A.A. Loris-Melikov's tomb (1844), Ananov's tombs (constructed by medieval Armenian canons) , khachkar on D.S. Melik-Beglyarov's tomb (1913), and the modernist gravestone for Nikolai Tarasov sculpted by Nikolai Andreev. The Armenian Cemetery is also the resting place for the remains of people who were not of Armenian descent.

Burials at Armenian Cemetery of Moscow

 Sergey Aslamazian (1897–1978), cellist, composer
 Hamo Beknazarian (1891–1965), film director
 Mikhail Chailakhyan (1901–1991), botanist
 Zara Dolukhanova (1918–2007), opera singer
 Alexey Dushkin (1904–1977), architect
 Ivan Lazarev (1820–1879), lieutenant general
 Pavel Lisitsian (1911–2004), opera singer
 Koryun Nahapetyan (1926–1999), painter-nonconformist and public activist
 Stepanos Nazarian (1812–1879), publisher, historian of literature and orientalist
 Kerope Patkanov (1833–1889), orientalist, researcher, professor
 Tigran Petrosian (1929–1984), World Chess Champion from 1963 to 1969
 Andrei Platonov (1899–1951), Russian writer
 Leonid Ramzin (1887–1948), Russian thermal engineer
 Nadezhda Rumyantseva (1930–2008), theatrical and cinema actress
 Marietta Shaginyan (1888–1982), Russian writer
 Smbat Shahaziz (1840–1908), Armenian poet, educator, writer
 Mikael Tariverdiev (1931–1996), composer
 Boris Tchaikovsky (1925–1996), composer

Books
(in Russian) Памятники архитектуры Москвы. Окрестности старой Москвы (северо-западная и северная часть территории). М., "Искусство XXI век", 2004, с. 71

External links

 Armenian cemetery official website
 Search ancestors: Armenian cemetery in Moscow 
 

Cemeteries in Moscow
Christianity in Moscow
Armenian diaspora in Russia
Armenian cemeteries
Eastern Orthodox cemeteries
Armenian churches in Russia
Churches in Moscow
1804 establishments in the Russian Empire
Cultural heritage monuments of federal significance in Moscow